Damour river or (Nahr Al Damour) is a  coastal river in the Mount Lebanon Governorate in Lebanon. The river's headwaters originate in and around the slopes of the 1943-meter peak Jabal el-Barouk, site of a nature preserve where some of Lebanon's largest and oldest Cedars of Lebanon are found, and flows west through the Jisr Al-Kadi valley, where it receives water from the creeks of the Chouf mountains. The river flows towards the Mediterranean Sea, south of Damour, which is both the largest town on its banks and the one which bears the river's name.

Mythology
During the Phoenician time, Canaanite people being affected by drought seasons, called the river "Damoros" ancient Tamyrus,  in the attribution of 'Damoros' god of immortality, related to 'Achtarout', god of love and beauty. This attribution symbolized the immortality of the river '' and the beauty of the region. In 1302, the river being a strategic point towards the holy land, a crusade battle took place on its edge. Following the battle, French crusaders nicknamed the river "Fleuve D'amour".

The city foundation

The city was founded on the river's edge by poor people who wanted to charge the right of way to the emirs. Because the river has a big flow rate in the winter season, residents assured the transport of passengers from side to other, obliging passengers to pay dearly for this service.

References

Rivers of Lebanon
Hellenistic religion
Tourism in Lebanon